Taiwanese fried chicken (also ), westernized as popcorn chicken, is a dish in Taiwanese cuisine commonly found as street snack and is indispensable to the night markets in Taiwan. It consists of bite-sized pieces of chicken, coated and fried with flour and seasoning mixture. Salt and pepper is the staple condiment, while chili powder, lightly fried basil leaves, and garlic bits are added for preference. Since the creation of this dish, it has become a popular fast food or restaurant appetizer in other countries in Asia, as well as among Asian immigrant populations overseas.

Origins
Taiwanese fried chicken is famous for its taste and texture, breaking through the confinement of the other snacks, and having a high status in the street food space. It then rapidly became prevalent in the street and night markets.

Despite the fact that the history of this dish is not long, it evolved rapidly due to stiff competition, and many different varieties have been made. In the early stages of the dish, the fried chicken was merely combined with different levels of chili powder to separate into mild, medium, and extra spicy flavors. Different varieties of the dish change according to trends and use many other seasonings, such as allspice, seaweed powder, mustard powder, etc. Some versions are covered in honey, or filled with cheese, or any number of radically different preparations.

Rather than being fried in just one pot of oil, it uses two pots of oil with different temperatures in order to optimize the crunchy texture and taste. Some vendors grill the chicken first, then fry it for extra crunch. It uses high-temperature oils to lock in the natural juices of the meat, followed by low temperature oils to complete the cooking process and ensure food safety. Using this method can eliminate common problems, such as chicken that is either not fully cooked or overcooked leading to loss of juiciness and a dry texture. Frying the chickens with one pot of oil often results in a thick layer of fried breading and thin layer of meat, while using two pots can prevent this from happening.

Some vendors fry the dish using the subcutaneous layer of fat on the chicken, which can make improve the fragrance and reduce greasiness in the final product. However, the cost of this method is high, which why it is less common.

Popularity in Hong Kong 
Hong Kong and Taiwan have close ties and people travel a lot between the two, hence the products have long been well known among Hong Kong people. This means that Hong Kong is a big market for Taiwanese food. For this reason, it is crucial to bring Hong Kong customers the authentic Taiwanese fried chicken, with high-quality ingredients. There are some famous brands selling Taiwanese food in Hong Kong, such as the Hot Star Large Fried Chicken and Ji Guang. In 2016, the Hot Star Large Fried Chicken had the largest market share of this industry, with 15 branches.

Traditional preparation
In general, only diced chicken leg or thigh meat is used and is marinated in soy sauce, sugar, garlic spread, rice wine, five-spice powder and spices powder for at least an hour. After marinating, chicken is dipped in beaten egg and then dredged in flour or sweet potato starch. Oil needs to be heated to 180 degrees (C) and when the oil is hot, the chicken can be added. It is deep fried until the surface color turns soft yellow and then it is ready to serve. Traditionally, after the chicken is fried, more pepper is added before eating.

In America
Taiwanese fried chicken is popular in the United States.

See also 
Taiwanese cuisine
Night markets in Taiwan
Barbecue chicken
Karaage

Notes

References

Jennings, R. (n.d.). Where to find the best Taiwanese food in Taipei. Retrieved 23 March 2016, from http://www.scmp.com/magazines/48hrs/article/1612070/where-find-best-taiwanese-food-taipei
Taiwanese fried chicken brand establishes foothold in Hong Kong. (2013, November 20). Retrieved 24 March 2016, from https://web.archive.org/web/20151231121035/http://www1.investhk.gov.hk/news-item/taiwanese-fried-chicken-brand-establishes-foothold-in-hong-kong/
宋博士香雞排大賣 計畫開第2分店. (２０１３, May ７). Retrieved 23 March 2016, from https://news.housefun.com.tw/news/article/20046630649.html
豪大大雞排 藉加盟店速擴張. (2015, May 25). Retrieved 23 March 2016, from http://hk.apple.nextmedia.com/financeestate/art/20150525/19159040
I. (2015, February 2). Taiwanese Popcorn Chicken | Taiwanese Popcorn Chicken Recipe | Eat the Love. Retrieved 23 March 2016, from http://www.eatthelove.com/2015/02/taiwanese-popcorn-chicken/
M. H. (2014, June 20). Fried Foods May Cause Type-2 Diabetes and Heart Disease. Retrieved 24 March 2016, from http://time.com/2907248/fried-food-linked-to-diabetes-and-heart-disease-with-an-asterisk/
Malaysia, R. (2009, October 21). Salt and Pepper Chicken Recipe | Easy Delicious Recipes: Rasa Malaysia. Retrieved 23 March 2016, from http://rasamalaysia.com/salt-and-pepper-chicken-recipe/
JJ.LYMM ( 2013, April 3).How to Cook Fried Chicken Steak 大雞排 Taiwanese Style Retrieved 23 March 2016, from http://taiwanduck.com/how-to-cook-fried-chicken-steak-taiwanese-style/

Taiwanese chicken dishes
Fried chicken